Camille Clovis Trouille (24 October 1889 – 24 September 1975) was a French artist known for surrealistic paintings of erotic and anti-clerical subjects.

Career
He was born in La Fère, France, and was trained at the École des Beaux-Arts of Amiens from 1905 to 1910. His service in World War I gave him a lifelong hatred of the military, expressed in his first major painting Remembrance (1931). The painting depicts a pair of wraith-like soldiers clutching white rabbits, an airborne female contortionist throwing a handful of medals, and the whole scene being blessed by a cross-dressing cardinal.

This contempt for the Church as a corrupt institution provided Trouille with the inspiration for decades of work:

Dialogue at the Carmel (1944) shows a skull wearing a crown of thorns being used as an ornament.
The Mummy shows a mummified woman coming to life as a result of a shaft of light falling on a large bust of André Breton.
The Magician (1944) has a self-portrait satisfying a group of swooning women with a wave of his magician's wand.
My Tomb (1947) shows Trouille's tomb as a focal point of corruption and depravity in a graveyard.

Trouille's other common subjects were sex, as shown in Lust (1959), a portrait of the Marquis de Sade sitting in the foreground of a landscape decorated with a tableau of various perversions, and a "madly egoistic bravado" employed in a self-mocking style.

He worked primarily for himself and made his living as a restorer and decorator of department store mannequins.

His 1946 portrait of a reclining nude shown from behind entitled Oh! Calcutta, Calcutta!—a pun in French—was chosen as the title for the 1969 musical revue Oh! Calcutta!.  (The French phrase "oh quel cul t'as" translates roughly as "oh what a lovely ass you have".)

Trouille died in Paris on 24 September 1975.

Style
After his work was seen by Louis Aragon and Salvador Dalí, Trouille was declared a Surrealist by André Breton—a label Trouille accepted only as a way of gaining exposure, not having any real sympathy with that movement.  Nonetheless, he maintained contact with the surrealists, including Breton and Marcel Jean.

The simple style and lurid colouring of Trouille's paintings echo the lithographic posters used in advertising in the first half of the 20th century.

Awards
In 2019 the National Leather Association International established an award named after Trouille for creators of surrealistic erotic art.

Further reading
Parcours à travers l'œuvre de Clovis Trouille 1889 - 1975 Clovis Prévost, Actes Sud - Edition Bernard Légier 
Clovis Trouille Jean-Marc Campagne; Jean-Jacques Pauvert, 1965
 Trouille, Clovis Didier Devillez Avant-gardes / Littérature / Beaux-arts / 2001 Format: 22 x 15 cm / sewed / 128 pages / in French 
 de Clovis Trouille, Gérard Lattier in French Actes Sud (1 March 2004) sewed - 44 pages 
 , Clovis Trouille: Un peintre libre et iconoclaste, Musée de Picardie / Amiens Métropôle, 2007. in French (May 2007)

References

External links
clovis-trouille.com
"Under the Influence: The Sexy, Sordid Surrealism of Clovis Trouille" by Kirsten Anderson
 Two works (The Magician and Les joueuses de cartes) not shown in the "Galerie" at the official Clovis Trouille site. Scroll about two-thirds of the way down the page.

1889 births
1975 deaths
People from La Fère
20th-century French painters
20th-century French male artists
French male painters
French surrealist artists